Qashqadaryo Region (Қашқадарё вилояти, قشقه‌دریا ولایتی; old spelling Kashkadarya Region) is one of the regions of Uzbekistan, located in the south-eastern part of the country in the basin of the river Qashqadaryo and on the western slopes of the Pamir-Alay mountains. It borders with Tajikistan, Turkmenistan, Samarqand Region, Bukhara Region and Surxondaryo Region. It covers an area of 28,570 km2. The population is estimated 3,408,345 (2022), with 57% living in rural areas. The regional capital is Qarshi (278,300 inhabitants).

Administrative divisions

The Qashqadaryo Region consists of 13 districts (listed below) and two district-level cities: Qarshi and Shahrisabz.

There are 12 cities (Qarshi, Shahrisabz, Gʻuzor, Qamashi, Beshkent, Koson, Kitob, Muborak, Yangi Nishon, Tallimarjon, Chiroqchi, Yakkabogʻ) and 117 urban-type settlements in the Qashqadaryo Region.

Geography
The climate is a typically arid continental climate and partly semi-tropical.

Economy
Natural resources include significant petroleum and natural gas reserves, with the Muborak Oil and Gas Processing Plant as the region's largest industry. Other industry includes wool processing, textiles, light industry, food processing and construction materials. Major agricultural activities include cotton, various crops and livestock. The irrigation infrastructure is very well developed with the large Tallimarjon Reservoir as a reliable water source.

The region has a well-developed transport infrastructure, with over 350 km of railways and 4000 km of surfaced roads.

Culture
The city of Shahrisabz, the birthplace of Amir Timur, is the main tourist attraction in the region.

Notes

 
Regions of Uzbekistan